The Chinese Room is a 1968 film directed by Albert Zugsmith. It starred Guillermo Murray, Elizabeth Campbell and Carlos Rivas.

It was based on a novel by Vivien Connell.

References

External links

1968 films
1960s mystery films
Films directed by Albert Zugsmith